The Gippsland Trophy is a new addition to the WTA Tour in 2021.

Elise Mertens won the title, defeating Kaia Kanepi in the final, 6–4, 6–1.

Due to a delayed schedule because of a COVID-19 case at a tournament quarantine hotel, all matches from the quarterfinal stage forward played a match tiebreaker in the final set (first to ten points, win by two).

Seeds
The top ten seeds received a bye into the second round. 

  Simona Halep (quarterfinals)
  Naomi Osaka (semifinals, withdrew)
  Elina Svitolina (quarterfinals)
  Aryna Sabalenka (second round)
  Johanna Konta (third round)
  Iga Świątek (third round)
  Elise Mertens (champion)
  Karolína Muchová (quarterfinals, withdrew)
  Ekaterina Alexandrova (semifinals)
  Wang Qiang (second round)
  Zheng Saisai (first round)
  Caroline Garcia (third round)
  Jeļena Ostapenko (third round)
  Coco Gauff (second round)
  Polona Hercog (second round)
  Laura Siegemund (third round)

Draw

Finals

Top half

Section 1

Section 2

Bottom half

Section 3

Section 4

References
 Main draw
 Official entry list

2021 WTA Tour
2021 Singles